CHT or ChT may refer to:

Medicine and biology 
 Certified Hyperbaric Technologist, a certification of the National Board of Diving and Hyperbaric Medical Technology
 Choline transporter (ChT), a protein
 Cross-sex hormone therapy

Places 
 Chatham Islands / Tuuta Airport, in New Zealand, IATA code
 Chau Tau station, a proposed station in Lok Ma Chau, Hong Kong, MTR station code
 Chittagong Hill Tracts, in Bangladesh

Science and technology 
 Cylinder Head Temperature gauge, an engine control sensor
 Cycloheptatriene, an organic chemical compound
 Ford CHT engine, a Compound High Turbulence engine which is an inline four-cylinder internal combustion engine produced during the 1980s and 1990s
 Conjugate convective heat transfer, a combination of heat transfer in solids and fluids
 Center for Humane Technology (formerly called Time Well Spent), a nonprofit organization working to reimagining the digital infrastructure

Other
 Canada Health Transfer
 Chunghwa Telecom, NYSE symbol
 Cross-Harbour Tunnel, in Hong Kong
 Shenzhen Changhong Technology Co., Ltd.
 Certified Hakomi Therapist